Nirmal Mahto was a political activist and prominent leader of Jharkhand Mukti Morcha. He was founder of All Jharkhand Students Union. He was prominent leader in movement for separate state of Jharkhand.

In 1980, due to controversy, Shibu Soren and Binod Bihari Mahato drifted apart. A. K. Roy also left. Shibu Soren appointed Mahato as president and himself as general secretary of Jharkhand Mukti Morcha. Mahato perceived that to fight for Jharkhand with just support of Jharkhand Mukti Morcha will be difficult. For this a stronger movement was required and it was decided to form a student union of Jharkhand Mukti Morcha.

On June 22, 1986 on the line of All Assam Students Union, All Jharkhand Students Union was formed. Prabhakar Tikey becomes the president and Suraj Singh Besra the general secretary. Mahato had a plan that all leaders and workers of AJSU should be trained in guerrilla warfare like revolutionary of Assam, Bodoland and Gorkhaland. He sent AJSU leaders to Assam and Gorkhaland. On 8 August 1987, Nirmal Mahato was murdered in Jamshedpur.

References

1950 births
1987 deaths
People from Jamshedpur
Jharkhand Mukti Morcha politicians
All Jharkhand Students Union politicians